This is a list of Asian countries and dependent territories by population sorted by normalised demographic projections.'''

Table

See also
List of Asian countries by area
List of Asian countries by population growth rate
List of Asian countries by life expectancy
List of countries by population
List of African countries by population
List of countries in the Americas by population
List of Arab countries by population
List of Caribbean island countries by population
List of Eurasian countries by population
List of European countries by population
List of European Union member states by population
List of Latin American countries by population
List of member states of the Commonwealth of Nations by population
List of Middle East countries by population
List of North American countries by population
List of Oceanian countries by population
List of South American countries by population
List of countries by past and future population
List of countries by population in 2000
List of countries by population in 2010
List of population concern organizations

References

Lists of countries by continent

Asia
Population
Asia